The Sitter Downers  is a 1937 short subject directed by Del Lord starring American slapstick comedy team The Three Stooges (Moe Howard, Larry Fine and Curly Howard). It is the 27th entry in the series released by Columbia Pictures starring the comedians, who released 190 shorts for the studio between 1934 and 1959.

Plot
The Stooges are suitors who go on a sitdown strike at their fiancees' home when their prospective father-in-law (James C. Morton) refuses to consent the marriages. The strike wins them fame and they receive numerous letters and gifts from fans, including a lot and materials for a "ready cut" house. The father-in-law reaches out to the government to have the Stooges removed from his house, but the government cannot intervene. The father-in-law eventually gets fed up and allows the Stooges to marry his daughters to end their strike.

The newly married couples soon arrive at their donated house lot, but realize that their new home is essentially a stack of lumber and appliances, meaning that they must build it themselves. Their wives decree that they will have no honeymoon until the Stooges finish the job. Frustrated at their nagging wives, they get to work anyway. After several mishaps, they manage to finish building the house, though in a poorly constructed fashion. Which includes a sideways door, a flight of stairs that goes nowhere (described as shelves) and a bathtub mounted to a wall. The wives are impressed, but as one of them pushes a loose board out of her way, the entire roof ends up crashing on top of all of them.

Production notes
The Stooges' wives are named Florabell (June Gittelson), Corabell (Betty Mack), and Dorabell (Marcia Healy, sister of the Stooges' former boss, Ted Healy). This was the last Stooge film released during Ted Healy's lifetime: he died on December 21, 1937. Filming commenced between May 27 and June 2, 1937.

A colorized version of this film was released as part of the 2004 DVD collection entitled "Goofs on the Loose".

Influence 
Some themes displayed in this film may have been inspired by the Buster Keaton film, One Week (1921).

References

External links 
 
 

1937 films
The Three Stooges films
American black-and-white films
1937 comedy films
Films directed by Del Lord
Columbia Pictures short films
American slapstick comedy films
1930s English-language films
1930s American films